Max Ohnefalsch-Richter (7 April 18506 February 1917) was a German archaeologist and antiquities seller. He was born in Saxony in 1850 and arrived in British occupied Cyprus in 1878 to work as a journalist, in the following year he worked for the British government and the British Museum in carrying out excavations on behalf of Sir Charles Newton as well as private individuals. The discovered material was later sold to various European museums as well as at public auctions. In 1910, he was caught smuggling antiquities outside of Cyprus and was banned from carrying out further excavations. He carried out a number of excavations in Cyprus, at the sites of Idalion, Politiko and Tamassos. Together with John Myres he published a catalogue of the Cyprus Museum in 1899. He was the editor of two journals, The Owl. Science, Literature and Art (1888-1889) and The Journal of Cypriote Studies, with only one issue in 1889.

Publications 
 Ohnefalsch-Richter, M., 1888. Die vor-babylonischen und babylonischen Einflüsse in Hissarlik und Cypern, Zeitschrift für Assyriologie, 3, 62-68.
Ohnefalsch-Richter, M., 1889. Ledrai-Lidir and the Copper-Bronze-Age, The Journal of Cyprian Studies, 1, 1-9.
Ohnefalsch-Richter, M., 1889. Excavations for Sir Charles Newton. September and October 1882. Temenos of Artemis-Kybele at Achna, The Owl. Science, Literature and Art, 10-11, 78-80, 81-86.
Ohnefalsch-Richter, M., 1889. Ancient Places of Worship in Kypros Catalogued and Described. Phd Thesis, University of Leipzig.1891.
Ohnefalsch-Richter, M., 1889. Kypros, Die Bibel und Homer. Berlin. 1893.
 Ohnefalsch-Richter, M., 1889. Cyprus, The Bible and Homer. London: Asher. 1893.
 Myres, J. L., & Ohnefalsch-Richter, M. 1899. A catalogue of the Cyprus Museum with a chronicle of excavations undertaken since the British occupation and introductory notes on Cypriote Archaeology. Clarendon Press.
Ohnefalsch-Richter, M., 1899. Neues über die auf Cypern mit Unterstützung seiner Majestät des Kaisers, der Berliner Museen und der Rudolf-Virchow-Stiftung angestellten Ausgrabungen, Verhandlungen der Berliner Gesellschaft für Anthropologie, Ethnologie und Urgeschichte, 29-78, 298-401.

See also 

 Tamassos bilinguals

References

External links 

 Cypriot artefacts at the British Museum

German archaeologists
1850 births
1917 deaths